The Association of Catholic Colleges and Universities (ACCU) is a voluntary association of delegates from Catholic institutions of higher learning.

History
It was founded in 1899 by fifty-three delegates from Catholic colleges across the United States. There are 247 degree-granting Catholic postsecondary institutions in the US. Currently the association includes more than 90% of accredited Catholic institutions of higher learning in the United States as well as over twenty international universities.

The president or rector of each participating institution serves as voting representative to the ACCU. There is also collaboration with the United States Conference of Catholic Bishops, the National Catholic Educational Association and various other agencies.

List of recent presidents 
 Monika Hellwig, Ph.D. (1996–2005)
 Richard Yanikoski, Ph.D. (2005-2010)
 Michael Galligan-Stierle, Ph.D. (2010–2019)
 Fr. Dennis Holtschneider, CM, Ed.D. (2019–Present)

References

External links
 

 

1899 establishments in the United States
Private and independent school organizations in the United States
College and university associations and consortia in the United States